The 2013–14 Buffalo Bulls men's basketball team represented the University at Buffalo, The State University of New York during the 2013–14 NCAA Division I men's basketball season. The Bulls, led by first year head coach Bobby Hurley, played their home games at Alumni Arena as members of the East Division of the Mid-American Conference. They finished the season 19–10, 13–5 in MAC play to be champions of the East division. They lost in the semifinals of the MAC tournament to Eastern Michigan. Despite the 19 wins and the division title, the Bulls did not participate in postseason play.

Season

Preseason
Following the firing of previous head coach Reggie Witherspoon and departures of assistant coaches Turner Battle, Kevin Heck, and Jim Kwitchoff, Buffalo began the re-tooling of its staff by hiring Bobby Hurley, formerly the associate head coach at Rhode Island, as their 12th head coach in program history, on March 26, 2013. Prior to his time at Rhode Island, Hurley was an assistant coach for Wagner.

On April 12, 2013, Hurley announced that Levi Watkins and Eric Harrield would join the team as assistant coaches. Watkins, a former player for NC State, had spent the past eight years working for the Wolfpack in different parts of the team. Harrield joined the team after spending five years as an assistant coach for New York City high school basketball powerhouse St. Anthony's High School. On June 18, Nate Oats was hired to fill out the coaching staff. Oats joined the Bulls from another high school basketball powerhouse, Romulus High School in Michigan.

On September 16, 2013, Hurley announced the team's complete schedule for the season. The main highlight on the non-conference schedule was a game against rival Canisius at the First Niagara Center, home of the Buffalo Sabres of the National Hockey League. Other key non-conference games included a trip to Texas A&M (Buffalo's first game against an SEC opponent since 1976), and home games against South Dakota State and rival St. Bonaventure. In the conference schedule, the Bulls were to play home-and-home series with Akron, Bowling Green, Kent State, Miami, Ohio, Northern Illinois, and Ball State, while playing one game against Central Michigan, Western Michigan, Eastern Michigan, and Toledo.

November
On November 8, the Bulls opened their season in College Station, Texas, as visitors against Texas A&M. Bobby Hurley's head coaching debut was spoiled by a strong defensive performance by the Aggies, who outscored Buffalo 25–6 over the final ten minutes en route to an 82–58 victory. Star forward Javon McCrea led the Bulls with 14 points.

Roster

Schedule and results
Source: 

|-
!colspan=9 style="background:#0068B4; color:white;"| Non-conference games

|-
!colspan=9 style="background:#0068B4; color:white"| Conference games

|-
!colspan=9 style="background:#0068B4; color:white"| MAC tournament

References

Buffalo
Buffalo Bulls men's basketball seasons
Buffalo Bulls
Buffalo Bulls